Morrison Hotel is the fifth studio album by American rock band the Doors, released on February 9, 1970, by Elektra Records. After the use of brass and string arrangements recommended by producer Paul A. Rothchild on their previous album, The Soft Parade (1969), the Doors returned to their blues rock style and this album was largely seen as a return to form for the band. The group entered Elektra Sound Recorders in Los Angeles in November 1969 to record the album which is divided into two separately titled sides, namely: "Hard Rock Café" and "Morrison Hotel". Blues rock guitar pioneer Lonnie Mack and Ray Neapolitan also contributed to the album as session bassists.

The album reached No. 4 on the Billboard 200, and performed better overseas than the preceding album (it was the group's highest-charting studio album in the United Kingdom, where it peaked at No. 12). The accompanying "You Make Me Real" / "Roadhouse Blues" single peaked at No. 50 in May 1970 on the Billboard 100 chart. The cover photo was taken by Henry Diltz.

Background 
On March 1, 1969, Jim Morrison performed while intoxicated at the Dinner Key Auditorium in Coconut Grove, Florida, in front of a crowd of nearly 12,000; he was charged for his performance and behavior with indecent exposure, on April 4. The incident negatively reflected on the band's publicity, sparking a "March for Decency" at the Miami Orange Bowl.

Consequently, twenty-five dates on the band's next tour were cancelled, and their records were blacklisted from radio airplay, resulting in the band abandoning the rest of their potential tour, costing what John Densmore characterized as "a million dollars in gigs." Nevertheless, the band gradually regained momentum by playing concerts throughout the rest of the year, including the Toronto Rock and Roll Revival. In July, the Doors released their fourth album, The Soft Parade, a heavily orchestrated affair that augmented the band's sound with horns and strings. Around early 1969, Morrison traded in his stage leathers for more conventional attire, grew a beard and gained weight as he attempted to live down his "Lizard King" image; however, his worsening alcoholism often undermined his efforts.

In November, a drunken Morrison caused such a disturbance on a flight to Phoenix, Arizona, to see a Rolling Stones concert that he was charged with a new skyjacking law that carried up to a $10,000 fine and a ten-year prison sentence.

Recording and composition 
Morrison Hotels back-to-basics approach largely stemmed from the group's dismay over the protracted sessions for The Soft Parade, which took nine months to record and cost $86,000 (equal to $ today), far more expensive than any previous Doors record. The band had also been stung by the critical reception to the record. On Morrison Hotel, there is a slight steer toward blues, which would be fully explored by the band on their next album L.A. Woman. Morrison Hotel was recorded between November 1969 and January 1970 with the exception of "Indian Summer", which was recorded on August 19, 1966 for The Doors, while "Waiting for the Sun" actually originated during the sessions for the band's third album.

Although Morrison Hotel contains no major hit singles, it features some of the band's most popular songs, including "Roadhouse Blues" and "Peace Frog", which would go on to become staples of classic rock radio. "Roadhouse Blues" took two days to record (November 4–5, 1969) with Paul Rothchild striving for perfection. Several takes from these sessions were included on the 2006 remastered album, with Morrison repeating the phrase "Money beats soul" over and over again. The sessions only took off on the second day, when distinguished blues guitarist Lonnie Mack (also signed to Elektra Records) joined in on bass and former Lovin' Spoonful bandleader John Sebastian (appearing under the pseudonym G. Puglese due to the constraint of his Reprise Records recording contract) joined in on harmonica. Over the course of the session, keyboardist Ray Manzarek switched from his Wurlitzer electric piano to a tack piano previously used on the Beach Boys "Good Vibrations".

The hook of "Peace Frog" is a distorted G5 chord played three times by Krieger, followed by a brief percussive wah-wah effect.  Morrison, who took the words from a notebook entitled Abortion Stories, begins nearly every line with the word "blood", often referring to "Blood in the streets". A brief musical interlude is next, followed by a guitar solo, and a spoken word verse ("Indians scattered on dawn's highway bleeding"). The song ends with a final chord as it segues into the next track, "Blue Sunday".

"The Spy" and "Queen of the Highway" celebrate Morrison's intense but troubled relationship with longtime girlfriend Pamela Courson. Originally "The Spy" was called "Spy in the House of Love", as shown on the Master Reel Control File, a line borrowed from A Spy in the House of Love, a novel by Anaïs Nin published in 1954. Both songs are tinged with ambivalence; on "The Spy," Morrison cautions, "I know your deepest, secret fears", while on "Queen of the Highway" he sardonically concludes, "I hope it can continue a little while longer". According to the 1980 Doors biography No One Here Gets Out Alive, it was during the Morrison Hotel sessions that Morrison and Courson had a violent argument after she drank his bottle of liquor so he could not drink it, with engineer Bruce Botnick recalling: "So here were the two of them, completely out of their minds and crying. He started shaking her violently. I think he was putting me on. She was crying out of control, telling him he shouldn't drink anymore and that's why she drank it. And I'm cleaning up and I said, 'Hey man, it's pretty late.' He looked up, stopped shaking her, said, 'Yeah, right', hugged her and they walked out arm in arm... he'd always give you a funny look afterward, to see your reaction."

 Album cover 

The cover photo was taken by Henry Diltz at the Morrison Hotel on South Hope Street in Downtown Los Angeles. The band were not given permission to photograph, so they did it while the clerk was called away from the desk. The band jumped right behind the windows and hit their places without shuffling as Diltz took the shot. The rear cover features a photograph of the Hard Rock Café at nearby 300 East 5th Street. The building is now home to a convenience store. It has been vacant for years, but a new development plan announced in 2018 may restore the building, which happened eventually in 2019 for the annual "Day of the Doors" fan event. Thirteen years later parts of Michael Jackson's music video for the song "Beat It" were filmed inside the former Hard Rock Café on 5th Street.

 Release and reception 
 Initial release 
Upon its release, Morrison Hotel was seen by many as a comeback for the Doors following the critical failure of The Soft Parade. Although the accompanying "You Make Me Real" / "Roadhouse Blues" single only peaked at No. 50 in May 1970 despite strong FM radio play of the latter song, the album was immediately certified gold by RIAA in February 1970 (the band's fifth consecutive album certification, a record among American hard rock bands of the era) before reaching No. 4 on the Billboard album chart in March during a 27-week stay, selling more than 650.000 copies in 10 days. Additionally, it became the band's highest-charting studio album in the United Kingdom, where it peaked at No. 12.

Dave Marsh, the editor of Creem magazine, called the album "the most horrifying rock and roll I have ever heard. When they're good, they're simply unbeatable. I know this is the best record I've listened to... so far", while Rock Magazine called it "without any doubt their ballsiest (and best) album to date". Circus praised it as "possibly the best album yet from the Doors" and "good, hard, evil rock... and one of the best albums released this decade". On the other hand, Rolling Stone critic Lester Bangs was mixed, who praised some of the tracks, especially the "powerful blast of raw funk" opener "Roadhouse Blues" and "the buoyant catchiness" of "Land Ho!", but criticized the remainder of the album to be uneven: "It's really a shame, too, because somehow one held high expectations for this album and wanted so badly to believe it would be good that one was afraid to listen to it when it was finally released."

During this period, the de facto blacklisting continued to persist in more socially conservative markets, particularly the Deep South; consequently, the band's 1970 American tour itinerary was largely confined to the Northeast, West Coast and more progressive Midwestern cities amid ongoing (albeit more sporadic) cancellations, including planned concerts in Salt Lake City and at the Jesuit-operated Fairfield University.

 Retrospective reviews 

In his 1981 retrospective review, Robert Christgau rated Morrison Hotel "B+" on an A+ to F scale. He expressed his preference of the A side (Hard Rock Café) over the B side (Morrison Hotel), both lyrically and musically. He noted that the "band is rocking tighter than it ever has, Robbie Krieger's phrasing keeps things moving, and Morrison's gliding vocal presence–arty and self-absorbed though it may be–provides focus." The Rolling Stone Album Guide gave a perfect rating of five stars out of five, and considered it to be the Doors' "most cohesive record," adding that aside "from the throwaway grunter", "Maggie M'Gill", all the other songs were "masterful—and the band swings tougher and easier than they ever had before."

In more recent reviews, Thom Jurek of AllMusic expressed that the Doors employed blues and R&B "to some degree on all of their albums, but never as consistently, adeptly, or provocatively as they did on Morrison Hotel, with absolutely stunning results." Sal Cinquemani of Slant Magazine gave the record three stars out of five; he praised Morrison's vocals as "cleaner and clearer" than before, and hailed particularly "Peace Frog" as one of the greatest songs in the Doors catalogue. Morrison Hotel holds currently a 78/100 approval rating based on 5 
critic reviews on Metacritic.

 Track listing 
Original album
Details are taken from the 1970 Elektra Records album and may differ from other sources.

Reissues

 Personnel 
Details are taken from the 2007 Rhino Records CD 40th Anniversary Edition liner notes with Bruce Botnick's and David Fricke's accompanying essays, which may differ from other sources.The Doors Jim Morrisonvocals
 Ray Manzarekpiano, organ, tack piano on "Roadhouse Blues" and "You Make Me Real"
 Robby Kriegerguitar
 John Densmoredrums; with brushes on "The Spy"Additional musicians Ray Neapolitanbass guitar
 Lonnie Mackbass guitar on "Roadhouse Blues" and "Maggie M'Gill"
 John Sebastian (as "G. Puglese")harmonica on "Roadhouse Blues"
 Paul Beavermoog synthesizer programming on "Waiting for the Sun"Technical'
 Paul A. Rothchildproduction
 Bruce Botnickengineering
 Gary Burdenart direction, sleeve design
 Henry Diltzsleeve photography

Charts

Certifications

References

Sources

External links 
 

The Doors albums
1970 albums
Albums produced by Paul A. Rothchild
Elektra Records albums